The Bombmaker is a two-part British television drama serial, written and created by Stephen Leather, and directed by Graham Theakston. It first broadcast on Sky One on 8 April 2001, with the second and final episode following a week later on 15 April. The series, based upon Leather's novel of the same name, stars Dervla Kirwan as Andrea Hayes, a former IRA bombmaker who is forced to come out of retirement when her daughter is kidnapped and held to ransom.

Mark Womack stars as Andrea's husband Martin, while Ciara Lyons plays the role of her daughter, Katie. David Hunt, Angeline Ball, Marc Warren, Francis Magee, Daragh O'Malley, Brendan Coyle and Samantha Bond are also credited as principal members of the cast. Filming on the series commenced in September 2000. Notably, the series has yet to be released on DVD.

Production
Dervla Kirwan said of her role as Andrea Hayes; "Graham Theakston, with whom I worked on The Dark Room (a BBC1 adaptation of the Minette Walters novel), was directing The Bombmaker and asked me if I was interested. I could see all the pitfalls in the script, but female characters who dominate like Andrea are few and far between. Whatever flaws there are, you owe it to yourself to do it. I've made a lot of mistakes in my career but the biggest mistake I've made is to turn down work. And I read Stephen Leather's book on which it was based, knew it was a bestseller and I think my commercial head took over."

Stephen Leather said of writing the series; "There are several major twists the audience won't see coming...it's not a run-of-the-mill kidnapping, but you don't find out until the end why the kidnappers have taken the little girl. You think it's an IRA story, but... it constantly keeps you guessing."
Cheese

Cast
 Dervla Kirwan as Andrea Hayes
 Mark Womack as Martin Hayes
 Ciara Lyons as Katie Hayes
 David Hunt as Egan
 Angeline Ball as Lydia McCracken
 Marc Warren as Quinn
 Francis Magee as O'Keefe
 Daragh O'Malley as Mick Canning
 Brendan Coyle as George McEvoy
 Samantha Bond as Patsy
 Brian Doherty	as DI Fitzgerald
 Keith Duffy as DS Power
 Maria McDermottroe as Miss O'Mara
 Barry Barnes as Padraig
 Scott Maslen as Captain Payne
 Andrew Pleavin Captain Crosbie
 Fiona Kember-Smith as Agent Gannon
 Lyn Fullerton	as Nuala

Episodes

References

External links
 

2001 British television series debuts
2001 British television series endings
2000s British drama television series
2000s British television miniseries
Sky UK original programming
English-language television shows
Television shows set in London